Gris-gris may refer to:

 Gris-gris (talisman), a voodoo talisman
Gris-Gris, popular name in Haiti and Guadeloupe for the Terminalia buceras tree

Music
 Gris-Gris, 1968 album by Dr. John
 The Gris Gris, psychedelic rock band
 "Gris-Gris", 2000 classical musical work by John Zorn on the album From Silence to Sorcery
 "Grisgris", a song by Canadian musician Grimes on her debut album Geidi Primes.

Other uses
 Gris-Gris, scenic attraction in Souillac, Mauritius
GriGris, 2013 film directed by Mahamat-Saleh Haroun
Grigri (climbing) or Gris-gris, belay device

See also
 Glis glis, the edible dormouse